The Handball League Australia (HLA) is an Australian-based championship for handball run by Australian Handball Federation. The principal idea was to play round robin games in each capital city. There are four teams representing four states.

Season
In the first season four rounds were planned but the third round was cancelled. The season starts in June and ends in December. Each team plays two matches against every other team.

Teams
The four teams of the 2016 season:

Champions
The complete list of the Handball League Australia champions since 2016:

Men's medal count

Media coverage

See also

Australian Handball Federation

References

External links
 Handball Australia webpage
 Handball League Australian webpage
 University of Sydney Handball webpage
 Brisbane Wolves webpage
 Saint Kilda Handball webpage

 
Handball competitions in Australia
Sports leagues in Australia
Handball leagues
2016 establishments in Australia
Sports leagues established in 2016
Professional sports leagues in Australia